Jordan Marcel Gilbert Veretout (born 1 March 1993) is a French professional footballer who plays as a midfielder for Ligue 1 club Marseille and the France national team. 

Veretout is a former France youth international, having represented his nation regularly at under-18, under-19, under-20 and under-21 level. In 2013, he won the FIFA U-20 World Cup. In 2021, he won the UEFA Nations League, coming on as a substitute in the final.

Early life
Veretout was born in Ancenis, Loire-Atlantique.

Club career

Nantes
Veretout made his first-team debut for French club Nantes on 13 May 2011 in a league match against Sedan. He made his first start the following season in the team's opening match of the campaign; a 1–0 extra time win over Reims in the Coupe de la Ligue.
Veretout made 146 appearances for Nantes over five years.

Aston Villa
On 31 July 2015, Veretout joined Birmingham-based Premier League club Aston Villa on a five-year contract for an undisclosed fee, believed to be in the region of £7 million. Manager Tim Sherwood praised the player, saying, "I know Veretout is very highly rated over in France." Veretout made his debut for Aston Villa in a 1–0 victory against AFC Bournemouth on 8 August.

Loan to Saint-Étienne
On 23 August 2016, Veretout joined AS Saint-Étienne on loan for one year without an option to buy from Aston Villa.

Fiorentina
On 25 July 2017, Veretout moved to Fiorentina agreeing to a four-year contract with the option of a fifth year. The transfer fee paid to Aston Villa was reported as €7 million.

Roma
On 20 July 2019, Veretout joined Roma on loan with an obligation to buy. On 1 July 2020, Veretout joined on a permanent basis for an initial fee of €16 million, potentially rising to €18 million. He signed a four-year contract.

On 28 February 2021, Veretout scored his 10th Serie A goal of the 2020–21 season, in a match against AC Milan. Veretout became the first French midfielder to reach that milestone since Michel Platini for Juventus in 1985–86.

Marseille 
On 5 August 2022, Veretout signed for Ligue 1 club Marseille on a three-year contract with an option for a further year. Marseille paid a transfer fee in the region of €11 million.

International career
Veretout is a former France youth international, having represented his country from under-18 through to under-21 level. Veretout won the 2013 FIFA U-20 World Cup in Turkey, where he was highly praised for his performances in a midfield-three that also included Geoffrey Kondogbia and Paul Pogba. Veretout scored a penalty in the final, as France won the tournament through a shoot-out.

On 26 August 2021, he received his first call to the France senior squad. On 1 September, he made his international debut in a 2022 FIFA World Cup qualification game against Bosnia and Herzegovina.. Veretout makes the final 26-man squad for the 2022 FIFA World Cup, making one appearance in the last group stage match against Tunisia.

Career statistics

Club

International

Honours
Nantes
Ligue 2: 2012–13

Roma
 UEFA Europa Conference League: 2021–22

France U20
FIFA U-20 World Cup: 2013

France
 UEFA Nations League: 2020–21
 FIFA World Cup runner-up: 2022

References

External links

 Club profile 
 
 

1993 births
Living people
Footballers from Loire-Atlantique
French footballers
Association football midfielders
FC Nantes players
Aston Villa F.C. players
AS Saint-Étienne players
ACF Fiorentina players
A.S. Roma players
Olympique de Marseille players
Ligue 2 players
Ligue 1 players
Premier League players
Serie A players
UEFA Europa Conference League winning players
France youth international footballers
France under-21 international footballers
France international footballers
2022 FIFA World Cup players
UEFA Nations League-winning players
French expatriate footballers
Expatriate footballers in England
Expatriate footballers in Italy
French expatriate sportspeople in England
French expatriate sportspeople in Italy